Josh Spiegel (born July 25, 1975) is an American radio personality based in Baltimore, Maryland.

He lives in Owings Mills, Maryland.

Career
Spiegel began his career in radio at age 12. He served as a radio intern at WPGC-FM and has worked on morning shows in Dallas, Denver, New York and Washington, D.C. Spiegel was also a news writer for the television stations WJZ in Baltimore and WJLA in D.C.

On August 22, 2005, Spiegel joined the WIYY 98 Rock Morning Show as a news man.

He formerly broadcast on the show Out to Lunch with Big O and Dukes on the then WHFS 99.1. The “Kirk, Mark and Spiegel” morning show was nominated as "Best Personality/Show Of The Year" by Radio & Records magazine in 2006.

In 2007, Baltimore City Paper named Spiegel the "Best Radio Personality"; for the rest of that day, the Mickey, Amelia & Spiegel Show was renamed to Spiegel, Spiegel & Spiegel in honor of the award.

In 2007 and 2008, the “Mickey, Amelia and Spiegel” show was nominated as "Best Personality/Show Of The Year" by Radio & Records magazine at its industry achievement awards.

References

External links
 Official site

American radio journalists
Radio personalities from Baltimore
Living people
People from Owings Mills, Maryland
1975 births